John "Gino" Gasparini is a former head coach of the University of North Dakota Fighting Sioux hockey men's team and also former president of the United States Hockey League. Gasparini held a position with St. Cloud State University in 2011-2012 as advisor to the President and is currently an independent sports consultant.

Career
He played for the Fighting Sioux from 1964-1967. Gino then played one year in the IHL in Toledo.  He then returned to UND as a graduate assistant while working on his master's degree. He transitioned into an assistant coaching position followed by the head coaching job.  Gasparini also acted as athletic director at UND from 1985-1990.

In 2014, Gasparini was inducted into the Northwestern Ontario Sports Hall of Fame in the builders category.

1978-1994 University of North Dakota - Head Coach
1994-2003 USHL - commissioner
2003-2009 USHL - president

Head coaching record

See also
List of college men's ice hockey coaches with 400 wins

References

Year of birth missing (living people)
Living people
North Dakota Fighting Hawks athletic directors
North Dakota Fighting Hawks men's ice hockey coaches
North Dakota Fighting Hawks men's ice hockey players
Toledo Blades players
Canadian ice hockey centres